Sēnasammata Vikramabāhu was King of Kandy from 1469 to 1511. Before becoming independent the provinces that made up the Kingdom of Kandy belonged to the Kingdom of Kotte. Vikramabāhu founded the city of Kandy, and during the reign of Parakramabahu VI Kandy became a separate entity seceding from Kotte. He was from the House of Siri Sanga Bo and reigned for 4 decades, setting an example of longevity and stability for the new kingdom. His son Jayavira Bandara was his successor.

See also
 List of Sri Lankan monarchs

Notes

References

Citations

Bibliography

External links
 Kings & Rulers of Sri Lanka
 Codrington's Short History of Ceylon

House of Siri Sanga Bo